Domrud-e Amir-e Vosta (also Romanized as Domrūd-e Amīr-e Vosţá) is a village in Afrineh Rural District, Mamulan District, Pol-e Dokhtar County, Lorestan Province, Iran. At the 2006 census, its population was 74, in 18 families.

References 

Towns and villages in Pol-e Dokhtar County